Hessel van der Kooij (20 April 1955 in West-Terschelling) is a popular Dutch singer. He is best known as Hessel, but has also recorded as Ray Maccannon.

Discography

Albums
 Flamborough Head (1981) (own label)
 Just my Luck (1988)
 Live in Frjentsjer (1989) (livealbum)
 Dust (1990)
 Live Ahoy '91 (1991) (livealbum)
 Me (1994)
 Flotsam (2000)

Singles 
 "Apocalyptic" ‎(1984)
 "Any River You Take" (1990)
 "Brother Sagittarius" (1990)
 "Terug naar Terschelling" (1991)
 "Somebody Told Me" (1991)
 "The World In Perfect State" (1992)
 "Twenty Times a Day" (1994)
 "Law and Order" (1999)
 "One Heart" (2000) (with daughter Tess)
 "Gloeiend Hout" (2014)

References

1955 births
Living people
Dutch male singers
People from Terschelling
21st-century Dutch male singers